Muller Santos da Silva  or simply  Muller  (born 11 March 1986) is a Brazilian football striker who played for ŁKS Łódź in the Polish Ekstraklasa.

References

1986 births
Living people
Brazilian footballers
Brazilian expatriate footballers
ŁKS Łódź players
Expatriate footballers in Poland
Brazilian expatriate sportspeople in Poland
Association football forwards